Le Roy Williams (August 18, 1845 – February 14, 1930) was an American soldier who received the Medal of Honor for valor during the American Civil War.

Biography
Williams joined the Union Army in July 1862, and served with Company G of the 8th New York Heavy Artillery. He received the Medal of Honor on April 1, 1898, for his actions in recovering the remains of the regiment's commander Peter A. Porter at the Battle of Cold Harbor in Virginia. He was later promoted to first lieutenant, and was transferred to the 10th New York Infantry shortly before the regiment was mustered out in June 1865.

After the war, Williams lived in Niagara, New York where he worked as a customs collector, and later in Buffalo, New York and Lansing, Michigan.

Medal of Honor citation
Citation:

 Voluntarily exposed himself to the fire of the enemy's sharpshooters and located the body of his colonel who had been killed close to the enemy's lines. Under cover of darkness, with 4 companions, he recovered the body and brought it within the Union lines, having approached within a few feet of the Confederate pickets while so engaged.

See also

List of American Civil War Medal of Honor recipients: T–Z

References

External links
Military Times

1845 births
1930 deaths
Union Army officers
United States Army Medal of Honor recipients
People of New York (state) in the American Civil War
American Civil War recipients of the Medal of Honor